St. James Episcopal Church is a historic Episcopal church in the historic district of Wilmington, North Carolina. The church is part of the Episcopal Diocese of East Carolina and is the oldest church in the city of Wilmington.   It is a contributing building in the Wilmington Historic District.

History 

New York architect Henry C. Dudley (1813-1894) designed the truss roof in 1871 and the chancel and transept in 1885.  Over his lifetime Dudley designed over 180 churches throughout the southern and eastern states.

Church interior 

St. James Episcopal Church's oak altar and reredos were carved by Silas McBee, depicting the Nativity, Crucifixion, and Resurrection of Jesus. McBee also designed the Bishop's chair and two of the stained glass windows, including The Resurrection of Christ.

Ecce Homo
A painting of Christ was found in the captain's cabin of the Fortuna by scavengers when being salvaged. The painting turned out to have been done by Spanish artist Francisco Pacheco, and was named Ecce Homo, Latin for Behold the Man. The painting was given to St. James Episcopal Church in 1751, and still resides in the church.

Notable burials
The historic graveyard at St. James has many notable burials. These burials include:
 Cornelius Harnett, American Revolutionary
 George Washington Glover, first husband of Mary Baker Eddy
 Grainger & Joshua Wright, Wrightsville Beach was named after their father Joshua Grainger Wright
 Robert Strange, Episcopal bishop
 Thomas Atkinson, Episcopal bishop
 Thomas H. Wright, Episcopal bishop and descendant of the family which owned what is now known as Airlie Gardens which includes the Mount Lebanon Chapel, the oldest church structure in New Hanover County which was commissioned built by his ancestral namesake.
 Elizabeth Brice, only daughter of Marmaduke Jones, Esq. who was a member of Royal Governor Arthur Dobbs's Council, and later Attorney General of NC.
 Samuel Townsend, Jr., older brother of Robert Townsend, member of the Culper Ring during the American Revolution.

References 

Churches completed in 1839
Cemeteries in North Carolina
Churches in Wilmington, North Carolina
Episcopal church buildings in North Carolina
19th-century Episcopal church buildings